is a Japanese manga series written and illustrated by Mitsutoshi Shimabukuro. The manga was serialized in Shueisha's Weekly Shōnen Jump magazine from July 1997 until August 2002, with its chapters collected in 24 tankōbon volumes. The series received the 2001 Shogakukan Manga Award for children's manga.

Plot
From the moment he was born, Takeshi was born to be a leader. His first word upon birth was "leader", and his father, Hiroshi, was a "leader" among salarymen. After Hiroshi suddenly dies, Takeshi makes it his life goal to be a leader like his father, so he joins his new first grade class and hopes to become a true leader to his classmates.

Characters

Takeshi's family

Poppo Elementary School

Media

Manga
The serialized manga was collected by Shueisha into 24 tankōbon volumes between December 1997 and September 1, 2002. Between June and November 2005, the series resumed in Super Jump with the added subtitle . The entire series was re-released by Shueisha in 13 bunkoban volumes between August 4, 2004, and December 2, 2005.

Film
Although no anime series of Seikimatsu Leader den Takeshi! exists, a pilot film was shown as part of the "Jump Super Anime Tour" of 1998 alongside pilots for One Piece and Hunter × Hunter.

References

External links
Official Shueisha Seikimatsu Leader den Takeshi! website 

Shōnen manga
Shueisha manga
Winners of the Shogakukan Manga Award for children's manga